This article mentions the introduction and confirmation process for any successful or unsuccessful cabinet nominees of Hassan Rouhani First and Second Administrations.

First cabinet

Confirmation process
The voting process began on 12 August 2013 and was continued until 15 August. On 15 August 2013, Parliament members confirmed 15 ministers and rejected three of them, namely those proposed to head the ministries of education, science, research and technology; and sports and youth. 284 out of 290 members of the Parliament were present at the session.

Ministry of Culture
Ali Jannati announced his nomination for minister of culture. Ali Jannati, son of the prominent Ayatollah Ahmad Jannati, is seen as is politically closer to Ayatollah Hashemi Rafsanjani.

Ministry of Petroleum
Hassan Rouhani nominated Bijan Zanganeh to return to the post of petroleum minister, which he held under Iran's reformist government from 1997 to 2005.

Ministry of Foreign Affairs
There were many candidates for ministry of foreign affairs: Ali Akbar Salehi, Kamal Kharazi, Sadegh Kharazi, Mohammad Javad Zarif and Mahmoud Vaezi.

Ministry of Agricultural

Ministry of Communication

Ministry of Defense

Ministry of Finance

Ministry of Education

Ministry of Energy

Ministry of Health

Ministry of Industry, Mines and Trade

Ministry of Intelligence

Ministry of Interior

Ministry of Justice

Ministry of Labour

Ministry of Science

Ministry of Transportation

Ministry of Sports and Youth Affairs

Second cabinet

Confirmation process

Ministry of Culture

Ministry of Petroleum

Ministry of Foreign Affairs

Ministry of Agricultural

Ministry of Communication

Ministry of Defense

Ministry of Finance

Ministry of Education

Ministry of Energy

Ministry of Health

Ministry of Industry, Mines and Trade

Ministry of Intelligence

Ministry of Interior

Ministry of Justice

Ministry of Labour

Ministry of Science

Ministry of Transportation

Ministry of Sports and Youth Affairs

References

Presidency of Hassan Rouhani
9th legislature of the Islamic Republic of Iran